Ayush Adhikari (born 30 July 2000) is an Indian professional footballer who plays as a midfielder for Indian Super League club Kerala Blasters.

Club career

Youth and early career
After impressing for Delhi state team during the U14 nationals, Ayush was selected for the U Dream Football programme in Germany, where he spent almost four years of his life. On his return to India, Ayush signed for Ozone FC. During the 2018–19 Santosh Trophy, Ayush finished as the top scorer with 6 goals despite his side failing to make the knockouts.

Kerala Blasters

In July 2019, he was signed by Kerala Blasters into their reserves side. However, he was loaned out to Indian Arrows in I-League.

He made his I-League professional debut for Indian Arrows on 28 December 2019 at Fatorda Stadium against Churchill Brothers, he started the match and was substituted in 86th minute as they won 1–2.

In 2020, Ayush was promoted into the senior side of the Blasters. He made his debut for the club against Hyderabad FC on 16 February 2021, by coming as a substitute for Gary Hooper.

Ayush was named in the Blasters squad for the 2021 Durand Cup, where he appeared for the club in all the three matches of the tournament. He played his first match of the 2021–22 Indian Super League season in the season opener against ATK Mohun Bagan FC on 19 November 2021, which they lost 4–2. The following game, Adhikari made his first start for the Blasters in Indian Super League, on 25 November 2021, in a 0–0 draw to NorthEast United FC before being substituted for Puitea. On 4 February 2022, Ayush saw two yellows, resulting in a sent-off in his second start of the season against NorthEast United, which they also won with the score of 2–1 at full-time.

In April 2022, Ayush was included in the Kerala Blasters' reserve team and was appointed as their captain to participate in the inaugural edition of the Reliance Foundation Development League. Under his captaincy, they became runners up of the tournament and qualified for the NextGen Cup, which took place in United Kingdom. He also captained the side in the NextGen Cup.

Career statistics

Club

Honours

Club

Kerala Blasters FC 

 Indian Super League runner up: 2021–22.

References

External links

2000 births
Living people
People from Delhi
Indian footballers
Indian Arrows players
I-League players
Footballers from Delhi
Kerala Blasters FC players
Association football midfielders
Ozone FC players
I-League 2nd Division players
Indian Super League players
Kerala Blasters FC Reserves and Academy players